List of Jewish communities by country, including synagogues, organizations, yeshivas and congregations.

Africa

Egypt
Egyptian Jews

Ethiopia
See Beta Israel

Morocco
Chaim Pinto Synagogue
École Normale Hébraïque
Ettedgui Synagogue
Ibn Danan Synagogue
Simon Attias Synagogue
Temple Beth-El (Casablanca)
Lycée Maïmonide

South Africa
Cape Town Holocaust Centre
Chassidim Shul
Gardens Shul
King David Schools, Johannesburg
Kollel Bet Mordechai
Kollel Yad Shaul
Lubavitch Yeshiva Gedolah of Johannesburg
Ohr Somayach, South Africa
Oxford Shul
Rabbinical College of Pretoria
Torah Academy School, Johannesburg
United Herzlia Schools
Yeshiva College of South Africa
Yeshivah Gedolah of Johannesburg
Yeshiva Maharsha Beis Aharon
Yeshiva of Cape Town
Yeshiva Pri Eitz Chaim

Tunisia
El Ghriba synagogue
Hara Seghira Synagogue
Mouansa Synagogue
Or Thora Synagogue (Tunis)
Synagogue of the Kohanim of Djirt
Zarzis Synagogue

The Americas

Argentina
Dr. Max Nordau Synagogue, Villa Crespo, Buenos Aires.
Yeshiva and Kollel Jafetz Jaim Argentina. Buenos Aires.

Canada
See List of Jewish communities in North America

Honduras
Maguen David Synagogue

Jamaica
Shaare Shalom Synagogue, Kingston

Puerto Rico
See List of Jewish communities in North America and List of synagogues in the United States

Surinam
Neveh Shalom Synagogue of Paramaribo

United States
List of synagogues in the United StatesJewish Federations of North America
List of Jewish communities in North America
:Category:Orthodox yeshivas in the United States

Venezuela
Bet-El Synagogue, Caracas

Asia
Hong Kong
Ohel Leah Synagogue

India
Knesset Eliyahoo Synagogue
Magen Abraham Synagogue
 Paradesi Synagogue

Iran
Abrishami Synagogue, Tehran
Persian Jews

Iraq
Iraqi Jews

IsraelSee List of yeshivas, midrashas and Hebrew schools in Israel and List of synagogues in IsraelMyanmar
Musmeah Yeshua Synagogue

Pakistan
 Magain Shalome Synagogue

People's Republic of China
 Kaifeng Jews
 Mir yeshiva (Belarus)

Singapore
Chesed-El Synagogue
Maghain Aboth Synagogue

SyriaSee Syrian JewsYemenSee Yemenite JewsEurope
AlbaniaSee Judaism in AlbaniaAzerbaijan

Synagogue of the Ashkenazi Jews in Baku

Belgium
Antwerp diamond district
Great Synagogue of Europe, Brussels

Bosnia and Herzegovina
Sarajevo Synagogue

 France 
Yeshiva of Aix-les-Bains
Yeshiva of Brunoy
Yeshiva of Creteil
Yeshiva of Vincennes
Yeshiva of Bussières
Yeshiva des Étudiants Paris
Yeshiva des Étudiants Marseille
Yeshiva Ketana of Marseille
Yeshiva Mekor Israel
Yeshiva Torat Haim Ohr Hanania
Yeshiva Yad Mordekhai

Germany
Central Council of Jews in Germany
Yeshiva Gedolah Frankfurt

Gibraltar
Synagogues of Gibraltar
Great Synagogue

Hungary
Budapest University of Jewish Studies

Isle of Man
Isle of Man Jewish Community (Manx Hebrew Congregation), see History of the Jews in the Isle of Man.

Jersey
Judaism in Jersey

Lithuania
Lithuanian Jews
History of the Jews in Lithuania

Poland

Union of Jewish Religious Communities in Poland

Portugal

Kadoorie Synagogue, Porto
Lisbon Synagogue

Serbia
Belgrade Synagogue

Spain

Beth Yaacov Synagogue (Madrid)
Synagogue of BarcelonaSee also #Gibraltar, aboveUnited KingdomSee also #Gibraltar, above''

Oceania

Australia
King David School, Melbourne

New Zealand 
Dunedin Synagogue

See also
Jewish population by country
List of synagogues in the United States
List of Jewish communities in the United Kingdom
List of Jewish communities in North America

Notes

 
Communities by countries